European Union culture policies aim to address and promote the cultural dimension of European integration through relevant legislation and government funding. These policies support the development of cultural activity, education or research conducted by private companies, NGO's and individual initiatives based in the EU working in the fields of cinema and audiovisual, publishing, music and crafts.

The European Commission runs Culture Programme (2007-2013), and the EU funds other cultural bodies such as the European Cultural Month, the Media Programme,  the European Union Youth Orchestra and the European Capital of Culture programme.

The EU awards grants to cultural projects (233 in 2004) and has launched a web portal dedicated to Europe and Culture, responding to the European Council's expressed desire to see the Commission and the member states "promote the networking of cultural information to enable all citizens to access European cultural content by advanced technological means."

History and development
The Council of Europe, which is distinct from the European Union (EU), first formalised cultural cooperation policy in Europe with its European Cultural Convention.

However, European Union-affiliated cultural policy, promoting unified cooperation between member states was first initiated with the 1992 Maastricht Treaty.

Currently, a cultural contact point (CCP) is established in each EU member state, responsible for facilitating communication between the European Commission's Cultural Programme and each member state.

Institutions and bodies
The most important EU institutions through which decisions are made regarding cultural policies are:
the European Commission acting in the areas of culture, sport and languages,
the Committee on Culture and Education of the European Parliament,
the Education, Youth and Culture sector of the Council of the European Union,
and the Education, Audiovisual and Culture Executive Agency of the European Commission.

List of institutions and bodies
The EU promotes cultural development through numerous institutions, civil society organisations and networks such as:
 Cinema of Europe
 Committee on Culture and Education
 Directorate-General for Education and Culture
 Education, Audiovisual and Culture Executive Agency
 Euranet
 Europa Nostra - foundation
 European Audiovisual Observatory
 European Commission
 European Commissioner for Education, Culture, Multilingualism and Youth
 European Film Promotion
 European Institute of Cultural Routes - network
 European League of Institutes of the Arts - network
 European Network of Information Centres - network
 European Union National Institutes for Culture
 European Union Youth Orchestra - network
 Union of the Theatres of Europe - network
 European Network of Cultural Centres - network
 Trans Europe Halles - network
 European Festival Association - network
 European Composer & Songwriter Alliance - ECSA - network
 European Choral Association - Europa Cantat EV - network
 Informal European Theatre Meeting - network
 Federation for European Storytelling - network
 Europe Jazz Network - network
 Club de Directores de Arte de Europa (Arts Director Club of Europe) ADCE - network
 Convention Theatrale Europeenne - network
 European Dancehouse Network - network
 European network on cultural management and policy (ENCATC) - network
 Eurozine - Network of European Cultural Journals
 Amateo the European Network for Active Participation in Cultural Activities Arts Take Part - Active Participation for Creative Europe
 Live (DMA) - network
 European Route of Industrial Heritage) - network
 European Music Council) - network
 Reseau Europeen de Musique Ancienne) - network
 Conseil des Architectes d'Europe) - network
 Association Europenne des Conservatoires, Academies de Musique et Musikhochschulen AEC) - network
 Circostrada) - network
 Secretariat de Jeunesses Musicales International JMI) - network

List of programmes
The EU promotes cultural development through numerous programmes such as:
 Culture 2000
 Erasmus Mundus
 Erasmus Programme
 Europa coin programme
 European Capital of Culture
 European Cultural Month
 European Cultural Route
 European Heritage Days
 European Library
 Europeana
 EUscreen
 MEDIA Programme
 Modul-dance
 Protected areas of the European Union
 Video Active

List of awards
The EU promotes cultural development through the policy of awards:
 Aristeion Prize
 Civis media prize
 Europe Book Prize
 European Border Breakers Award
 European Inventor of the Year
 European IST Grand Prize
 European Union Prize for Contemporary Architecture
 European Union Prize for Literature
 Lux Prize
 Young European of the Year

List of non-EU cultural institutions, bodies and programmes
The following is a list of European institutions, bodies and programmes which may be thought to be related to the EU/EU policy, but are not:
 Arte
 Council of Europe
 Compendium of cultural policies and trends in Europe
 Eurocities
 EUROFRAME
 Europalia
 European Broadcasting Union
 European Cultural Foundation
 European Dancehouse Network
 European Film Academy
 European Museum Forum
 University Network of the European Capitals of Culture

Policies by sector

Arts and Culture
The European Commission runs the EU's Culture Programme, which typically runs in 7 year intervals. The last Culture Programme was called Culture 2000. For the next Culture Programme (2007-2013) was spent €400 million. Current program is called "Creative Europe" (2014-2020).

Sports

Sport is largely the domain of the member states, with the EU mostly playing an indirect role. Recently the EU launched an anti-doping convention. The role of the EU might increase in the future, if (for example) the Treaty of Lisbon were to be ratified by all member states. Other policies of the EU have affected sports, such as the freedom of employment which was at the core of the Bosman ruling, which prohibited national football leagues from imposing quotas on foreign players with EU nationality.

Languages

The languages of the European Union are languages used by people within the member states of the European Union. They include the 24 official languages of the European Union plus many others. EU policy is to encourage all its citizens to be multilingual; specifically, it encourages them to be able to speak two languages in addition to their mother tongue. The reason for this is not only to promote easier communication between Europeans, but also to encourage greater tolerance and respect for diversity. A number of EU funding programmes actively promote language learning and linguistic diversity. The content of educational systems remains the responsibility of individual member states. Further information can be found at language policy.

Impact of cultural policies

European identity

Economic development

Expansion of the European Union

Criticisms

See also
 Bologna Process
 Cultural policy
 Culture of Europe
 Educational policies and initiatives of the European Union
 European Communities
 Europeanisation
 Greater Region
 Lifelong Learning Programme 2007–2013
 Religion in the European Union
 Trans-cultural diffusion

References

Further reading
 Gielen, P. (2015). No Culture, No Europe. On the Foundation of Politics. Valiz: Amsterdam.

External links 
 Language and culture section, euractiv.com
 Europe of cultures 50 years of artistic creation and cultural life from the 27 countries of the European Union with Ina
 EU Culture Portal (archived)
 Euronews - Culture

 
European culture
Politics of the European Union